Admiral Watkins may refer to:

Frederick Watkins (Royal Navy officer) (1770–1856), active in the French Revolutionary and Napoleonic Wars
James D. Watkins (1927–2012), U.S. Navy admiral who served as Chief of Naval Operations and Secretary of Energy
John A. Watkins (admiral) (fl. 1990s–2020s), U.S. Navy rear admiral

See also
Watkins (surname)